Ruth Ann Gaines (born 1947) is the Iowa State Representative from the 33rd District. A Democrat, she has served in the Iowa House of Representatives since 2011.

Early life 
Gaines was born in 1947 in Des Moines, Iowa. In 1965, she graduated from St. Joseph Academy. She received a B.A. in drama/speech from Clarke College in 1969 and an M.A. in dramatic art from the University of California, Santa Barbara in 1970.

Political career 
, Gaines serves on several committees in the Iowa House: the Education, Public Safety, and Veterans Affairs committees. She also serves as the ranking member of the Government Oversight committee.

Legacy 
The auditorium at East High School in Des Moines was named after Gaines.

Electoral history
*incumbent

References

External links

 Representative Ruth Ann Gaines official Iowa General Assembly site
 
 Financial information (state office) at the National Institute for Money in State Politics

1947 births
Date of birth missing (living people)
Living people
Clarke University alumni
University of California, Santa Barbara alumni
Democratic Party members of the Iowa House of Representatives
Politicians from Des Moines, Iowa
Women state legislators in Iowa
African-American women in politics
African-American state legislators in Iowa
21st-century American politicians
21st-century American women politicians
21st-century African-American women
21st-century African-American politicians
20th-century African-American people
20th-century African-American women